Salem al-Meslet (Arabic: سالم المسلط, born 1959) is a Syrian politician who is currently President of the National Coalition for Opposition and Revolutionary Forces of Syria.

Early life
Salem al-Meslet was born in Hasaka, Syria in 1959.

Political history
On 12 July 2021, Meslet was elected as President of the National Coalition for Opposition and Revolutionary Forces of Syria, replacing Naser al-Hariri.

References

1959 births
Living people
National Coalition of Syrian Revolutionary and Opposition Forces members
Syrian politicians